Patrick "Pat" Ferris (born October 28, 1975 in North York, Ontario) is a Canadian curler from Grimsby, Ontario. He currently skips his own team.

Career
Ferris had a successful junior career. In 1993, he skipped his Sutton District High School team to a provincial schoolboy championship.  He won back to back provincial junior titles in 1995 and 1996. This qualified Ferris to skip the Ontario team at the Canadian Junior Curling Championships in both of those years. At the 1995 Canadian Juniors, he led Ontario and teammates Chris Schell, Bryan Johnson and Paul Webster to a 6-5 record, missing the playoffs. In 1996, his rink would find more success. The team, which consisted of Johnson, Shaun Harris and future U.S. champion Heath McCormick finished the round robin with a 7-5 record, in a 4-way tie for 3rd. In their first tiebreaker match, the team lost to Nova Scotia.

Pat Ferris competes regularly on the World and Ontario Curling Tours having amassed 8 career victories, including the 2014 CookstownCash presented by Comco Canada Inc. WCT event.  He has competed in nine Ontario Tankard Provincial Championships (as of 2023).

Personal life
Pat Ferris resides in Grimsby, Ontario with his Wife and two Daughters.  He is a Commercial Insurance Broker with Milmine Insurance Brokers in Stoney Creek.

References

External links

Living people
1975 births
Curlers from Toronto
Sportspeople from North York
People from Grimsby, Ontario
Canadian male curlers
20th-century Canadian people